Aslihah also spelled Aslihah or Asleha, is a village in southeastern Syria, administratively part of the as-Suwayda District of the as-Suwayda Governorate, located south of as-Suwayda. In the 2004 census, it had a population of 364.

The inhabitants of Aslihah are predominantly Greek Orthodox Christians. They are estimated to form three-fourths of the total population. The village’s main church is dedicated to St. George and was built in 1934 over an older structure.

References

Bibliography

Eastern Orthodox Christian communities in Syria
Populated places in as-Suwayda District